John Moore (before 1814 – 1858 or later) was a contractor and political figure in Lower Canada. He represented Sherbrooke in the Legislative Assembly of Lower Canada from 1834 until the suspension of the constitution in 1838 and then in the Legislative Assembly of the Province of Canada from 1841 to 1844, representing Sherbrooke County.

He was probably born in England and settled in the Eastern Townships. He married Lois Caswell in 1824. In 1825, Moore was colonization agent for Newport township. He was employed in construction of a railway in Sherbrooke district during the period from 1843 to 1853. Moore withdrew his name as a candidate for the assembly before the election held in 1844. He is known to have been living in Sherbrooke in 1858.

References 
 

Members of the Legislative Assembly of Lower Canada
Members of the Legislative Assembly of the Province of Canada from Canada East
People from Sherbrooke
19th-century births
Year of birth unknown
19th-century deaths
Year of death unknown